James Brown's Dry Goods Store is a historic dry goods store located at Eastville, Northampton County, Virginia. It was built about 1880, and is a two-story, three-bay, rectangular frame commercial building located in the center of the town's historic main thoroughfare. It measures 32 feet wide by 100 feet deep. The front facade features a wide full-length porch, highly decorative molding over the transom of the display windows, and a stylized Palladian window framed with Stick / Eastlake trim.

It was listed on the National Register of Historic Places in 2001.  It is located in the Eastville Historical District.

References

Commercial buildings on the National Register of Historic Places in Virginia
Commercial buildings completed in 1880
Buildings and structures in Northampton County, Virginia
National Register of Historic Places in Northampton County, Virginia
Individually listed contributing properties to historic districts on the National Register in Virginia
1880 establishments in Virginia